St Theresa's Catholic Primary School is situated on Prince of Wales Road in the suburb of the Manor in the City of Sheffield, England. The school caters for children between the ages of three and twelve.

Church
St. Theresa's Roman Catholic Church shares the parish with St. Anthony's Roman Catholic Church in nearby Gleadless and Our Lady of Lourdes, Hackenthorpe, having previously shared a parish with St Joseph's Roman Catholic Church in Handsworth. The parish was founded in 1924, and there has been a church and school on the site since 1927.

References

Primary schools in Sheffield
Voluntary aided schools in Yorkshire
Catholic primary schools in the Diocese of Hallam